The 1996 Open Gaz de France was a women's tennis tournament played on indoor carpet courts at the Stade Pierre de Coubertin in Paris in France that was part of Tier II of the 1996 WTA Tour. The tournament was held from 13 February until 18 February 1996. Unseeded Julie Halard-Decugis won the singles title.

Finals

Singles

 Julie Halard-Decugis defeated  Iva Majoli 7–5, 7–6(7–4)
 It was Halard-Decugis' 3rd title of the year and the 9th of her career.

Doubles

 Kristie Boogert /  Jana Novotná defeated  Julie Halard-Decugis /  Nathalie Tauziat 6–4, 6–3
 It was Boogert's 1st title of the year and the 1st of her career. It was Novotná's 1st title of the year and the 67th of her career.

References

External links 
 ITF tournament edition details
 Tournament draws

Open Gaz de France
Open GDF Suez
Open Gaz de France
Open Gaz de France
Open Gaz de France